Ear wiggling is movement of the external ear using the three muscles which are attached to it forward, above and behind. Some mammals such as cows have good control of these muscles, which they use to twitch and orient their ears, but humans usually find this difficult.

J. H. Bair conducted experiments on humans, using a kymograph to measure their ear movements. He found that only two out of twelve subjects had any voluntary control at the start but that the others could acquire this by training with an early form of biofeedback.

Female rats wiggle their ears when they are in heat, to excite male rats and encourage them to mate.

References

Biofeedback
Ear